Edmonton/St. Albert Airport  was located  northwest of St. Albert, Alberta, Canada.

The site is used as Edmonton/St. Albert Heliport.

See also
List of airports in the Edmonton Metropolitan Region

References

Defunct airports in Alberta